North Coast Tsunami FC is an American professional soccer club based in California currently playing in US Club Soccer's National Premier League.  The team originally started play in the NPSL in 2012.

History 
During the club's only season in the NPSL they finished in last place in the West Region - Northern Conference with a 3-1-9 record.  While in the NPSL, Sergio Guerrero was named a Player of the Week in a game the Tsunami won 1–0 over the Sonoma County Sol after saving 19 shots on goal. The club moved down to National Premier League in 2013. The club stated the move will provide the Tsunami the opportunity to compete year round as part of the NorCal Premier League, starting with the U-23 College Summer League.

Year-by-year

Stadium 
The team plays at the College of the Redwoods Community Stadium in Eureka, CA.

References

External links
Official team site

Association football clubs established in 2012
National Premier Soccer League teams
Soccer clubs in California
2012 establishments in California
2013 disestablishments in California
Association football clubs disestablished in 2013
Eureka, California